Róbert Fritsch is a Hungarian Greco-Roman wrestler. He won the gold medal in the 72 kg event at the 2022 European Wrestling Championships held in Budapest, Hungary.

Career 

In 2021, he won the gold medal in the 72 kg event at the Matteo Pellicone Ranking Series 2021 held in Rome, Italy.

He won one of the bronze medals in the 72 kg event at the 2021 European Wrestling Championships held in Warsaw, Poland. He defeated Chingiz Labazanov of Russia in his bronze medal match.

Major results

References

External links 

 

Living people
Year of birth missing (living people)
Place of birth missing (living people)
Hungarian male sport wrestlers
European Wrestling Championships medalists
European Wrestling Champions
21st-century Hungarian people